Městečko na dlani is a 1942 Czechoslovak film. The film starred Josef Kemr.

Cast 
Josef Kemr
Anna Letenská

References

External links

1942 films
1940s Czech-language films
Czechoslovak black-and-white films
Czech comedy-drama films
Czechoslovak comedy-drama films
1942 comedy-drama films
Films directed by Václav Binovec
1940s Czech films